Maeng Sang-hoon (born October 29, 1960) is a South Korean actor from the Sinchang Maeng clan.

Filmography

Television series

Film

References

External links 
 
 
 

1960 births
Living people
South Korean male television actors
South Korean male film actors
Sinchang Maeng clan